Edward Henry Smith (May 5, 1809 – August 7, 1885) was an American politician who served one term as a U.S. Representative from New York during the American Civil War.

Biography
Born in Smithtown, Long Island, New York, Smith attended private schools. He engaged in agricultural pursuits. He served as Justice of the Peace in the township of Smithtown 1833–1843, assessor 1840–1843, and supervisor 1856–1860.

Congress 
Smith was elected as a Democrat to the Thirty-seventh Congress (March 4, 1861 – March 3, 1863) defeating incumbent Luther C. Carter in the election.

Later career and death 
He was not a candidate for renomination in 1862. He resumed farming in Suffolk County, New York.

He died in Smithtown, New York on August 7, 1885. He was interred in St. James' Protestant Episcopal Cemetery, St. James, Long Island, New York.

References
 Retrieved on 2009-04-11

1809 births
1885 deaths
People of New York (state) in the American Civil War
Democratic Party members of the United States House of Representatives from New York (state)
19th-century American politicians